Teche voda is a studio album by Sofia Rotaru, recorded at Franchising records in Ukraine. The album entered in the 10 Best Albums of 2004 in Ukraine.

Track listing

Languages of performance 
Songs are performed in Ukrainian language.

References

External links 
Umka.com.ua album description and evaluation
artvertep
Volodymyr Ivasyuk Official Fan-Club Site

2004 albums
Sofia Rotaru albums